Mordellistena huachucaensis is a beetle in the genus Mordellistena of the family Mordellidae. It was described in 1946 by Ray.

References

huachucaensis
Beetles described in 1946